Sujit Mondal is an Indian film director in Bengali cinema. He started his career as an assistant director. From 2009, he started directing Bengali feature films with Saat Paake Bandha. His also directed Paglu 2 (2012).  Mondal was chief assistant director in 2002 for Raaz.

Koel Mallick was seen as a warrior queen for the first time in Bengali movie Arundhati which was one of the most expensive Bengali movies in 2014.

Career 
Sujit was chief assistant director in 1998 for Ghulam, 2002 for Aap Mujhe Achche Lagne Lage, 2005 for Elaan.

Sujit directed his debut feature film Saat Paake Bandha in 2009 with Jeet and Koel. In 2009 he directed another film, Bolo Na Tumi Aamar. His next releases, Shedin Dekha Hoyechilo and Romeo, were commercially successful in West Bengal. In 2012, his directorial venture Paglu 2 was a romantic comedy drama. In 2014, he directed horror thriller film Arundhati. In 2019, he completed two films: Anweshan, starring Rituparna Sengupta, and Priyanka Sarkar which Postponed and  Tumi asbe Bole, starring Bonny Sengupta and Koushani Mukherjee.

Filmography

Assistant Director
Assistant Director

Awards
ZEE Bangla Gourav Samman Award for Best Film Bolo Na Tumi Aamar, 2010- Nominated. 
ZEE Bangla Gourav Samman Award for Best Actress (Bolo Na Tumi Amar, 2010) winner. 
Best Bengali film nominations for Anandalok Puraskar for Paglu 2 in 2012
Anandalok Award for Best Actor (Dev) - Nominated for Paglu 2.

References

External links
 

Living people
Indian film directors
Bengali film directors
University of Calcutta alumni
Film directors from Kolkata
1962 births